Federico Gorrieri (born 4 October 1985) is an athlete from San Marino who competes primarily in the horizontal jumps and sprinting events. He represented his country at one outdoor and three indoor World Championships.

Competition record

Personal bests
Outdoor
100 metres – 10.98 (2011)
Long jump – 7.03 (+1.4 m/s) (Rieti 2004)
Triple jump – 14.71 (+2.0 m/s) (Marsa 2003) NR
Indoor
60 metres – 7.04 (Ancona 2011)
Long jump – 6.70 (Birmingham 2007)
Triple jump – 14.59 (Ancona 2007)

References

1985 births
Living people
Sammarinese long jumpers
Sammarinese triple jumpers
Sammarinese male sprinters
World Athletics Championships athletes for San Marino
Athletes (track and field) at the 2015 European Games
European Games competitors for San Marino
Male long jumpers
Male triple jumpers